Symmetrocapulidae is an extinct taxonomic family of fossil snails, gastropod mollusks in the monotypic superfamily  Symmetrocapuloidea within the clade Cycloneritimorpha.

This superfamily has one family and no subfamilies.

Genera 
The type genus is Symmetrocapulus Dacqué, 1934.

References